Rougé is a commune in the Loire-Atlantique department in western France, near Rennes.

The name "Rougé" comes from the Latin "Rubiacus", means the red place, in reference to the high iron-composition of the ground.

Geography
The river Chère forms small part of the commune's southern border.

Population

References

See also
Communes of the Loire-Atlantique department

Communes of Loire-Atlantique